CICE may refer to:

 A previous call sign for TVOntario
 CICE (sea ice model)